The O.A.C.A. Olympic Indoor Hall (honorarily named Nikos Galis Olympic Indoor Hall since 2016), which is a part of the Olympic Athletic Center of Athens (O.A.C.A.) «Spyros Louis», was completed in 1995, and was the largest indoor venue in use for sporting events at the 2004 Summer Olympics in Athens, Greece. It is located in Marousi, Athens. It is considered to be one of the biggest and most modern indoor sports arenas in all of Europe.

The 19,443-capacity arena also contains a training facility. Since 2016, it has been named after the well-known Greek former basketball player of Panathinaikos and Aris Thessaloniki Nikos Galis.

Construction

Nikos Galis Olympic Indoor Hall is notable for its distinctive A-frame roof that features four huge pillars, each of which is 35 meters tall, that stand 108 meters apart from each other. According to the Greek Ministry of Sports, it is the largest indoor sporting arena of its kind in the world. The arena is also constructed in a unique way so that an abundant amount of natural light comes into the arena during the day.

The arena seats up to 17,600 for gymnastics events, although only 12,500 seats were made publicly available for the gymnastics competition at the 2004 Olympics. It seats up to 18,989 for basketball games, which includes 18,500 regular seats for the fans, 300 seats for the media members, and 189 seats for VIPs.

A large scale arena renovation was completed in 2004, for the 2004 Summer Olympics. The arena was then renovated again in 2016.

2004 Summer Olympics

The arena was used for artistic gymnastics and trampolining, and also hosted the finals of the basketball matches at the 2004 Summer Olympics. Renovation of the building for the Olympics was completed on 30 June 2004, and it was officially reopened on 10 August 2004, shortly before the beginning of the games.

Basketball use

The Indoor Hall is the regular home court for the Greek Basket League professional basketball club Panathinaikos. It is also the primary home court of the senior Greek National Basketball Team.

The arena was used to host the quarterfinals, semifinals, and finals stages of the 1998 FIBA World Championship. In addition, it was used as home court of Maroussi B.C. in some European games.

On 4 and 6 May 2007, the Indoor Hall hosted the EuroLeague 2006–07 season's Final Four, the semifinals and finals rounds of Europe's principal pro club competition in basketball, which saw hometown favourite Panathinaikos win the title.

On 9 December 2007, FIBA announced that the Olympic Indoor Hall was selected as the host of the 2008 FIBA Olympic Qualifying Tournament for the 2008 Summer Olympic Games. At the qualifying tournament, hosts and favourites Greece, along with the German and Croatian national basketball teams, qualified for the final 2008 Olympic Basketball Tournament.

On 5 April 2018, the Indoor Hall was announced as the venue of the 2018 Basketball Champions League Final Four, during which AEK Athens served as host.

On 19 May 2022, the Greek government and basketball club Panathinaikos reached an agreement for the exclusive use of the OAKA Indoor Hall by the "Greens". The arena, along with its auxiliary facilities, will be granted from 2023 for the next 49 years to Panathinaikos, with the club bearing its maintenance and operating costs. Both the Greek state and Panathinaikos have expressed the wish so as the Greek national basketball team continues to use the OAKA Indoor Hall as their home court.

Musical events

On 18 and 20 May 2006, the Hall hosted the 51st Eurovision Song Contest, that was held in Athens, after Greece's victory at the Song Contest in 2005. There were 15,000 seats available for spectators, both for the semifinal and the grand final.

Some of the entertainers who have performed at the arena include Maluma,Slayer,Rotting Christ, Pearl Jam, Enrique Iglesias, Depeche Mode, Jennifer Lopez, Björk, Beyoncé, Slayer, Shakira, Roger Waters, Aloha from Hell, Tokio Hotel, Helena Paparizou, Sakis Rouvas and Anna Vissi.

See also
 List of basketball arenas by capacity
 List of indoor arenas in Greece
 List of indoor arenas in Europe

References

External links

Olympic Athletic Center of Athens Official Site
Nikos Galis Indoor Hall
Nikos Galis Indoor Hall Info And Pictures At Stadia.gr
Best Indoor Basketball 

Indoor
Basketball venues in Greece
Indoor arenas in Greece
Olympic basketball venues
Olympic gymnastics venues
Sports venues completed in 1995
Venues of the 2004 Summer Olympics